The 1983 San Francisco 49ers season was the franchise's 34th season in the National Football League and their 38th overall. The team attempted to improve on its 3–6 record from 1982. The 49ers started the season with a loss to the Philadelphia Eagles, 22–17. However, the 49ers throttled the Vikings the next week 48–17 and then the Cardinals the following week 42–27. They ended the first half of the season 6–2 before splitting their last eight games to finish the season 10–6 and clinching the NFC West and the #2 seed in the playoffs. In the divisional round of the playoffs, the 49ers came back to beat the Lions 24–23 after Joe Montana found Freddie Solomon in the end zone with 1:23 remaining, and Lions kicker Eddie Murray missed a 41-yard field goal as time expired. However, in the NFC Championship game, the 49ers were not able to outlast the top-seeded Redskins, as after coming back to tie a game in which they trailed 21–0 at the start of the 4th quarter, they lost 24–21 after Washington took the lead on a field goal with 40 seconds left in the game.

Offseason

NFL Draft

Personnel

Staff

Roster

Regular season

Schedule

Game summaries

Week 1

Week 2

Standings

Postseason

Schedule

NFC Divisional Playoff 

Quarterback Joe Montana hit Freddie Solomon with a 14-yard touchdown pass with 1:23 left in the game as the 49ers held off the Lions 24–23. Lions kicker Eddie Murray missed a 43-yard field goal with 5 seconds left in the game, one of his two misses in the 4th quarter. Five interceptions of Lions quarterback Gary Danielson played a major role in the 49ers' win.

NFC Championship Game 

The 49ers overcame a 21-point 4th-quarter deficit to tie the game. But two controversial calls against the 49ers set up a 25-yard field goal by Mark Moseley with 40 seconds remaining. Joe Montana was then intercepted on the last play of the game to seal the win for Washington.

Awards and records 
 Ray Wersching, Franchise Record, Most Field Goals in One Game, 6 Field Goals (October 16, 1983)

References

External links 
 1983 49ers on Pro Football Reference
 49ers Schedule on jt-sw.com

San Francisco
NFC West championship seasons
San Francisco 49ers seasons
1983 in San Francisco
San